Darcy Street, officially the South Hobart Oval, is a multi-use stadium in Hobart, Australia. It is mainly used for soccer and is the home ground for South Hobart FC. The stadium has a capacity of 1,500 people.

References

External links
Official Website of South Hobart
Soccerway page

Soccer venues in Tasmania
South Hobart FC
Sports venues in Hobart